The 2016–17 season will be the 56th season of competitive association football in Algeria.

Competitions

International competitions

Men's

Promotion and relegation

Pre-season

National teams

Algeria national football team

2017 Africa Cup of Nations qualification

2017 Africa Cup of Nations

2018 FIFA World Cup qualification – CAF Third Round

International Friendlies

Algeria national under-23 football team

Group D

Algerian women's national football team

League season

Ligue Professionnelle 1

Ligue Professionnelle 2

Ligue Nationale du Football Amateur

Group Est

Group Centre

Group West

Inter-Régions Division

Groupe Ouest

Groupe Centre Ouest

Groupe Centre Est

Groupe Est

Ligue Régional I

Ligue Régionale Ouargla

Women's football

Diary of the season

Deaths

Retirements

Notes

References